Helge Vindenes (born 28 April 1931) is a Norwegian diplomat.

He took the cand.jur. degree in his education, and started working for the Norwegian Ministry of Foreign Affairs in 1958. He was promoted to assistant secretary in 1971 and sub-director in 1973, before working special missions from 1978 to 1982. He was the Norwegian ambassador to Chile from 1982 to 1988, permanent under-secretary of state (the highest-ranking bureaucrat position) from 1989 to 1992, Norwegian ambassador to Spain from 1992 to 1996 and Ireland from 1996 to 1999.

References

1931 births
Living people
Norwegian civil servants
Ambassadors of Norway to Chile
Ambassadors of Norway to Spain
Ambassadors of Norway to Ireland